Velvet & Brass is a 1995 album by Mel Tormé, with Rob McConnell's Boss Brass big band. This was Tormé's second recording with the band; his first was released in 1987. Velvet & Brass was Tormé's final studio album.

Track listing
"Nobody Else but Me" (Oscar Hammerstein II, Jerome Kern) – 3:59
"Liza (All the Clouds'll Roll Away)" (George Gershwin, Ira Gershwin, Gus Kahn) – 3:33
"If You Could See Me Now" (Tadd Dameron, Carl Sigman) – 4:50
"I Get a Kick Out of You" (Cole Porter) – 5:14
"Have You Met Miss Jones?" (Lorenz Hart, Richard Rodgers) – 2:48
"Love Walked In" (G. Gershwin, I. Gershwin) – 3:34
"Autumn Serenade" (Peter DeRose, Sammy Gallop) – 5:58
"My Sweetie Went Away" (Lou Handman, Roy Turk) – 3:28
"I'll Be Around" (Alec Wilder) – 4:23
"On the Swing Shift" (Harold Arlen, Johnny Mercer) – 3:18
"High and Low" (Desmond Carter, Howard Dietz, Arthur Schwartz) – 3:11
"In the Still of the Night" (Cole Porter) – 5:02
"I'm Glad There Is You" (Jimmy Dorsey, Paul Madeira, Paul Mertz) – 4:36

Personnel 
Mel Tormé – vocals
Rob McConnell's Boss Brass big band

References

1995 albums
Concord Records albums
Mel Tormé albums
Rob McConnell & The Boss Brass albums